Peter Pank is a Spanish-language comic book written and drawn by Spanish cartoonist Max (Francesc Capdevila) in 1983. It is an adult-oriented parody of J.M. Barrie's Peter and Wendy, with the protagonist as a vicious, rebellious, belligerent punk with a "No Future" attitude.

The comic mostly follows the original work's plot, but is heavily influenced by punk culture and anarchism. Various characters have been replaced with more "adult" versions: the Lost Boys are punks, the Natives are hippies, the pirates are rockers, and the mermaids are BDSM dominas. Many parts of the comic include male and female nudity. The comic ends with Peter sentenced to be hanged for rape, and Wendy and her brothers returned home, her becoming a prostitute and the boys becoming drug addicts.

References
 Francesca Lladó, "Los comics de la transición: el boom del cómic adulto 1975-1984", Colección Viñetas vol.3, Glénat, 2001, 
 Antoni Remesar, Antonio Altarriba, "Comicsarias: ensayo sobre una década de historieta española (1977-1987)", PPU, 1987, 
 Laurent Rieutort, "Massif central, hautes terres d'initiatives", Presses Univ Blaise Pascal, 2006, 
 Roger Sabin, "Adult comics: an introduction", New accents, Taylor & Francis, 1993, 
 Dez Skinn, "Comix: the underground revolution", Collins & Brown, 2004,

External links 
 Beyond Borders: Peter Is A Punk Rocker 

Spanish comics titles
Pank, Peter
Pank, Peter
Pank, Peter
Parody comics
Satirical comics
Underground comix
Parodies of literature
1983 comics debuts
Erotic comics
Works based on Peter Pan
Rape in fiction
Punk comics
Works published under a pseudonym